Communiqué is the second studio album by British rock band Dire Straits, released on 5 June 1979 by Vertigo Records internationally, Warner Bros. Records in the United States and Mercury Records in Canada. The album featured the single "Lady Writer," which reached number 45 on the Billboard Hot 100 chart and number 51 on the UK Singles Chart. The album reached number one on album charts in Germany, Spain, New Zealand, and Sweden, number 11 in the United States and number 5 in the United Kingdom. Communiqué was later certified gold in the United States, platinum in the United Kingdom and double-platinum in France.

It is the last album to feature David Knopfler, who would later depart from the band during the making of their following album and the last with the original lineup.

Recording
After the Dire Straits Tour finished in Hitchin on 18 November 1978, Dire Straits set to work on recording their second album. The recording sessions for Communiqué took place from 28 November to 12 December 1978 at Compass Point Studios in Nassau. The album was mixed in January 1979 at Muscle Shoals Sound Studio in Alabama. The album was produced by Jerry Wexler and Barry Beckett, veteran producers from Muscle Shoals Sound Studio. Beckett (credited as B. Bear) also contributed keyboards to some of the album's nine tracks.

Release
Communiqué was released on vinyl LP and cassette on 15 June 1979, eight months after the release of the band's self-titled debut. It entered the German charts at number one, while its predecessor was still at number three.

"Lady Writer" was the first single released from the album, displaying the expanding scope of Knopfler's lyricism, also featured on the opening track, "Once Upon a Time in the West."

Communiqué was remastered and reissued with the rest of the Dire Straits catalogue in 1996 for most of the world outside the United States and on 19 September 2000 in the United States.

Dire Straits toured throughout 1979 after the recording sessions were completed. The Communiqué Tour started in February 1979 in Rotterdam, four months before the album's release on 15 June. Dire Straits would play a total of 116 concerts in Europe and North America, the final concert taking place on 21 December 1979 in London.

Communiqué was the last album to feature David Knopfler, who left the band over creative differences with his brother during the recording of their third album in August 1980. It is the only Dire Straits album not represented on the compilation Private Investigations: The Best of Dire Straits & Mark Knopfler.

Artwork
The album cover was designed by Hothouse, art directed by Alan Schmidt with the cover illustration by Geoff Halpin.

Critical reception

In a 1979 review for the Birmingham Daily Post, Jonathan Daümler-Ford called it a "competent record", but wrote that "the songs sound like pale imitations, or the cuts which were not good enough for Dire Straits".
In his retrospective review for AllMusic, William Ruhlmann gave the album two and a half out of five stars, writing that the second album "seemed little more than a carbon copy of its predecessor with less compelling material."

Record World said of "Once Upon a Time in the West" that Knopfler's "unique and super-sensitive vocals evoke vivid imagery that's totally enhanced by the Wexler-Beckett production team."

Track listing

Personnel

Dire Straits
 Mark Knopfler – vocals, lead and rhythm guitars
 David Knopfler – rhythm guitar, backing vocals
 John Illsley – bass guitar, backing vocals
 Pick Withers – drums

Additional personnel
 Barry Beckett – keyboards
 Jerry Wexler and Barry Beckett (credited as B. Bear) – producers
 Gregg Hamm – mix engineer
 Jack Nuber – engineer
 Bobby Hata – mastering
 Paul Wexler – mastering supervisor
 Bob Ludwig – remastering
 Thelbert Rigby – tape operator
 Alan Schmidt – art direction
 Geoff Halpin – illustrations

Charts
Communiqué spent 32 weeks on the UK Albums Chart.

Weekly charts

Year-end charts

Sales and certifications

References
Notes

Citations

External links
 Communiqué at Mark Knopfler official website
 

Dire Straits albums
1979 albums
Albums produced by Jerry Wexler
Albums produced by Barry Beckett
Vertigo Records albums
Warner Records albums